FC Neftyanik Uray was a Russian football team from Uray. It played professionally in the Russian Second Division in 1992.

External links
  Team history at KLISF

Defunct football clubs in Russia
Sport in Khanty-Mansi Autonomous Okrug